Cities and towns under the oblast's jurisdiction:
Tambov (Тамбов) (administrative center)
city districts:
Leninsky (Ленинский)
Oktyabrsky (Октябрьский)
Sovetsky (Советский)
Kirsanov (Кирсанов)
Kotovsk (Котовск)
Michurinsk (Мичуринск)
Morshansk (Моршанск)
Rasskazovo (Рассказово)
Uvarovo (Уварово)
Districts:
Bondarsky (Бондарский)
with 8 selsovets under the district's jurisdiction.
Gavrilovsky (Гавриловский)
with 6 selsovets under the district's jurisdiction.
Inzhavinsky (Инжавинский)
Urban-type settlements under the district's jurisdiction:
Inzhavino (Инжавино)
with 13 selsovets under the district's jurisdiction.
Kirsanovsky (Кирсановский)
with 8 selsovets under the district's jurisdiction.
Michurinsky (Мичуринский)
with 14 selsovets under the district's jurisdiction.
Mordovsky (Мордовский)
Urban-type settlements under the district's jurisdiction:
Mordovo (Мордово)
Novopokrovka (Новопокровка)
with 5 selsovets under the district's jurisdiction.
Morshansky (Моршанский)
with 16 selsovets under the district's jurisdiction.
Muchkapsky (Мучкапский)
Urban-type settlements under the district's jurisdiction:
Muchkapsky (Мучкапский)
with 7 selsovets under the district's jurisdiction.
Nikiforovsky (Никифоровский)
Urban-type settlements under the district's jurisdiction:
Dmitriyevka (Дмитриевка)
with 5 selsovets under the district's jurisdiction.
Pervomaysky (Первомайский)
Urban-type settlements under the district's jurisdiction:
Pervomaysky (Первомайский)
with 10 selsovets under the district's jurisdiction.
Petrovsky (Петровский)
with 12 selsovets under the district's jurisdiction.
Pichayevsky (Пичаевский)
with 10 selsovets under the district's jurisdiction.
Rasskazovsky (Рассказовский)
with 13 selsovets under the district's jurisdiction.
Rzhaksinsky (Ржаксинский)
Urban-type settlements under the district's jurisdiction:
Rzhaksa (Ржакса)
with 10 selsovets under the district's jurisdiction.
Sampursky (Сампурский)
with 5 selsovets under the district's jurisdiction.
Sosnovsky (Сосновский)
Urban-type settlements under the district's jurisdiction:
Sosnovka (Сосновка)
with 16 selsovets under the district's jurisdiction.
Staroyuryevsky (Староюрьевский)
with 9 selsovets under the district's jurisdiction.
Tambovsky (Тамбовский)
Urban-type settlements under the district's jurisdiction:
Novaya Lyada (Новая Ляда)
with 25 selsovets under the district's jurisdiction.
Tokaryovsky (Токарёвский)
Urban-type settlements under the district's jurisdiction:
Tokaryovka (Токарёвка)
with 9 selsovets under the district's jurisdiction.
Umyotsky (Умётский)
Urban-type settlements under the district's jurisdiction:
Umyot (Умёт)
with 8 selsovets under the district's jurisdiction.
Uvarovsky (Уваровский)
with 7 selsovets under the district's jurisdiction.
Zherdevsky (Жердевский)
Towns under the district's jurisdiction:
Zherdevka (Жердевка)
with 11 selsovets under the district's jurisdiction.
Znamensky (Знаменский)
Urban-type settlements under the district's jurisdiction:
Znamenka (Знаменка)
with 7 selsovets under the district's jurisdiction.

References

Tambov Oblast
Tambov Oblast